Paul Lê Đắc Trọng (Hanoi, June 15, 1918 – September 7, 2009) was a Vietnamese bishop of the Catholic Church.

Trong was born in Kim Lâm, Thanh Oai, Hanoi French Indochina, ordained a priest on April 1, 1948, appointed auxiliary bishop of archdiocese of Hanoi, along with titular bishop of Igilgili (Titular Episcopal See of Igilgili, Algeria), on March 23, 1994 and consecrated bishop on August 15, 1994. Trong retired from the Archdiocese of Hanoi on January 21, 2006 at age 87.

See also
Archdiocese of Hanoi

Notes

20th-century Roman Catholic bishops in Vietnam
1918 births
2009 deaths